The  Washington Redskins season was the franchise's 66th season in the National Football League (NFL) and their 62nd in Washington, D.C. The team failed to improve on their 9–7 record from 1996 and finished 8–7–1, knocking them out of playoff contention for the fifth straight year. This was the Redskins' first season playing in their new stadium, Jack Kent Cooke Stadium, that would be later called FedExField. In an infamous game with the New York Giants on November 23, 1997, The Redskins missed the potential game-winning 54-yard field goal when Scott Blanton shanked the ball wide right, it what would have been a 37-yard field goal. However, Michael Westbrook was called for unsportsmanlike conduct and crazy sequences lead the Redskins to their first tie since 1971.

Offseason

NFL draft

Personnel

Staff

Roster

Regular season

Schedule

Standings

References 

Washington
Washington Redskins seasons
Red